Luís Carlos Patraquim (born on 26 March 1953 in Maputo) is a Mozambican poet, playwright and journalist.

He moved to Sweden as a refugee in 1973. In 1975, he moved back to Mozambique, where he worked for A Tribuna magazine, the Agência de Informação de Moçambique (AIM), the Instituto Nacional de Cinema de Moçambique (INC) and Tempo magazine.

Patraquim lives in Portugal since 1986.

Works 
 Monção. Lisboa e Maputo. Edições 70 e Instituto Nacional do Livro e do Disco, 1980
 A inadiável viagem. Maputo, Associação dos Escritores Moçambicanos, 1985
 Vinte e tal novas formulações e uma elegia carnívora. Lisboa, ALAC, 1992.
Prefácio de Ana Mafalda Leite
 Mariscando luas. Lisboa, Vega, 1992
Com Chichorro (ilustrações) e Ana Mafalda Leite
 Lidemburgo blues. Lisboa, Editorial Caminho, 1997
 O osso côncavo e outros poemas (1980–2004). Lisboa, Editorial Caminho, 2005
Antologia de poemas dos livros anteriores e poemas novos
Com um texto de Ana Mafalda Leite: O que sou de sobrepostas vozes
 Pneuma Lisboa, Editorial Caminho, 2009
 A Canção de Zefanías Sforza (romance) Porto, Porto Editora, 2010
 Antologia Poética. Belo Horizonte, Editora UFMG, 2011. Coleção Poetas de Moçambique
Antologia de poemas dos livros anteriores e poemas novos.
Com posfácio de Cíntia Machado de Campos Almeida : Incursões de um poeta 'nas veias em fúria da memória'''

Theatre 
 Karingana Vim-te buscar D'abalada Tremores íntimos anónimos (with António Cabrita)

 Awards 
 Prémio Nacional de Poesia de Moçambique (1995)

 Sources and external links
 Mexia, Pedro. Novas formulações moçambicanas
 Saúte, Nelson; Sopa, António (compiladores). A Ilha de Moçambique pela voz dos poetas''
 3=Alguns poemas
 Lusofonia.com.sapo.pt

1953 births
Living people
Mozambican writers
People from Maputo